Libbey or Libby Siding is a settlement in northwest Texas County, Oklahoma, situated in the Oklahoma Panhandle, at an elevation of 3,724 feet.  It is located approximately six miles southwest of Elkhart, Kansas on US Route 56. It is on the Atchison, Topeka and Santa Fe Railroad.

Libbey was the locale for Irish artist John Gerrard’s internationally-displayed exhibition, “Sow Farm (near Libbey, Oklahoma) 2009,” shot around an agricultural facility there.

References

Unincorporated communities in Texas County, Oklahoma
Unincorporated communities in Oklahoma
Oklahoma Panhandle